Zieria whitei is a plant in the citrus family Rutaceae and is endemic to a small area of north Queensland. It is a dense, compact shrub with erect wiry branches, three-part leaves and groups of up to three white to pale pink flowers with four petals and four stamens. It is only known from two populations.

Description
The upper surface of the leaves may have a few hairs but the lower surface is moderately densely hairy. The groups of flowers are usually longer than the leaves.

Taxonomy and naming
This zieria was first formally described in 1942 by Cyril Tenison White who gave it the name Zieria aspalathoides var. intermedia and published the description in Proceedings of the Royal Society of Queensland.<ref name=APNI(1)>{{cite web|title=Zieria aspalathoides var. intermedia|url= https://id.biodiversity.org.au/instance/apni/523577|publisher=APNI|access-date=31 October 2017}}</ref> In 2002, James Armstrong raised the variety to species status, giving it the name Zieria whitei but did not publish the change. In 2007 Marco Duretto and Paul Forster published the new name and retained White's type specimen as the type of the new species. The specific epithet (whitei) was the name given by Armstrong to honour Cyril White, "who named a number of new taxa of Zieria''."

Distribution and habitat
This zieria grows among heathy shrubs and in woodland near Ravenshoe and Atherton in the Einasleigh Uplands biogeographic region.

References

External links
 

whitei
Sapindales of Australia
Flora of Queensland
Plants described in 1942
Endemic flora of Australia